Allex is a commune near Crest in the Drôme department in southeastern France. The river Drôme runs nearby.

Population

See also
 Communes of the Drôme department

References

External links

 Town hall website

Communes of Drôme
Dauphiné